Dawn of the East is a lost 1921 American silent drama film directed by Edward H. Griffith and written by E. Lloyd Sheldon. The film stars Alice Brady, Kenneth Harlan, Michio Itō, America Chedister, Betty Carpenter, and Harriet Ross. The film was released in October 1921, by Paramount Pictures.

Plot
As described in a film magazine, Russian Countess Natalya (Brady) is stranded in Peking, China, and is forced to dance in a public hall to support an invalid sister. She is lured into marriage to a Chinese man through political intrigue, but escapes as she believes the ceremony was not completed and goes to America, where she becomes engaged to an American diplomat. Her persecutors follow her, but she outwits them in a happy ending.

Cast 
Alice Brady as Countess Natalya
Kenneth Harlan as Roger Strong
Michio Itō as Sotan
America Chedister as Mariya
Betty Carpenter as Sonya
Harriet Ross as Mrs. Strong
Sam Kim as Wu Ting
Frank Honda as Liang
H. Takemi as Kwan
Patricio Reyes as Chang

References

External links 

 
 

1921 films
American silent feature films
1920s English-language films
Silent American drama films
1921 drama films
Paramount Pictures films
Films directed by Edward H. Griffith
Lost American films
American black-and-white films
1921 lost films
Lost drama films
1920s American films